Darryl Yokley II (born February 2, 1982, Los Angeles, California) is an American tenor and alto saxophonist, composer and music conservatory teacher. Darryl started to learn jazz after extensive studies in classical saxophone. As a bandleader of Sound Reformation, Yokley has gained recognition as an inventive composer and soloist after releasing its debut album The Void (2012). He has performed with Motown legends The Four Tops, The Temptations, and The O'Jays, and other notable music artists.

Biography
Yokley began his musical studies in his native state of California, starting at the age of ten on clarinet and moving to saxophone a year later upon entering middle school. He took quickly to the saxophone and the language of music, placing in honors bands for both classical and jazz. Yokley moved to North Carolina in high school and met his future saxophone professor James Houlik at a clinic in Lenoir, NC. It was then in 1997 that Yokley decided to focus solely on classical saxophone and it would be ten years before he truly rededicated himself to jazz. He attended Duquesne University for his undergraduate studies and Michigan State University for graduate studies. He studied with the aforementioned James Houlik and then later concert alto saxophonist Joseph Lulloff in Michigan, practicing constantly and perfecting his skills on the instrument.

After graduating Michigan State University, Yokley started playing and touring with Motown legends the Four Tops, the Temptations, and the O'Jays. He moved to Philadelphia in 2007 to complete his “doctoral studies" from mentors such as Tim Warfield, Orrin Evans, Mike Boone, Sid Simmons, Mickey Roker, Edgar Bateman, and Byron Landham, performing frequently in Philadelphia. He moved to New York in 2009 and within less than a year started performing with Orrin Evans, the Captain Black Big Band, Valery Pomonarev, Jack Walrath, Frank Lacy, Duane Eubanks, Bill McHenry, Stacy Dillard, and others.

Darryl Yokley formed his band Sound Reformation in 2010. Their debut album The Void (2012) received favorable reviews from critics Brent Black and Charles Latimer. The band premiered a commissioned project for the Philadelphia Museum of Art in January 2015 which received much praise by critics and audience members alike, including the Philadelphia City Paper.

In addition to leading his own band, Yokley often performs with a singer Rhonda Ross alongside fellow Sound Reformation bandmate Duane Eubanks. Yokley the special guest artist for the closing night awards ceremony at the 17th annual Arpa International Film Festival in Hollywood, he has performed for a legendary musician and producer Quincy Jones, and has expanded to the international stage performing as a sideman and a special guest artist in Japan.

In 2018, Darryl Yokley released his second album with the Sound Reformation entitled 'Pictures at an African Exhibition' accompanied by a small chamber wind ensemble. The project is also his first cross disciplinary collaboration with British born artist David Emmanuel Noel, who specifically produced original artwork for the album.

Discography
 2010: The Captain Black Big Band
 2012: Darryl Yokley's Sound Reformation - The Void
 2012: Together presented by Truth Revolution Records
 2018: Darryl Yokley's Sound Reformation - Pictures at an African Exhibition

References

External links
 

1982 births
Living people
Musicians from New York City
Michigan State University alumni
African-American saxophonists
American jazz alto saxophonists
American jazz tenor saxophonists
American jazz composers
American male jazz composers
American classical saxophonists
American male saxophonists
Jazz musicians from New York (state)
21st-century American saxophonists
Classical musicians from New York (state)
21st-century American male musicians
21st-century African-American musicians
20th-century African-American people